Pretty Woman – The Musical is the special self-released digital download studio release by Canadian singer-songwriter Bryan Adams, released online on 4 March 2022. It was released a week prior to the album So Happy It Hurts and it's the first Bryan Adams album to be released not on a physical format. The album features re-recorded songs Adams and Jim Vallance wrote for the musical of the same name.

Background
The songs from this album were original written for the musical adaptation of the 1990 film Pretty Woman. The film was produced on a budget of just $14 million, earning over $463 million in global box office receipts. Written by J. F. Lawton, and directed by Garry Marshall, the musical centers around Vivian Ward a free spirited Hollywood prostitute who lives with her sarcastic wisecracking Greek American best friend and roommate Kit De Luca. Kit taught Vivian the prostitute trade. Vivian is hired by Edward Lewis a handsome wealthy businessman to be his escort for several business and social functions. And their developing relationship over the course of her week-long stay with him.

In March 2014, it was announced that a musical adaptation of the film was being developed for the stage, with original screenwriter Lawton and director Marshall attached to write the book. The following year Marshall revealed that rights had been secured. Although Marshall died in July 2016, producer Paula Wagner said that work on the musical would continue. In September 2017, it was announced that the show would receive its world premiere at the Oriental Theatre, Chicago, before an expected Broadway transfer in fall 2018.

In an interview, director Jerry Mitchell said that the score "will have the feel of late '80s-early '90s rock: That's one of the great things about Bryan Adams—it's where he lives. So you've got the rock and roll stuff, the up-tempos." A cast album was released in 2018, but Adams decided to record the songs himself as well.

A number of songs Adams and Vallance wrote for the musical ended up not being used in the show itself. However, several of them were included in subsequent Bryan Adams albums: Please Stay was recorded for the 2018 compilation album Ultimate, I Could Get Used To This can be found on the 2019 album Shine A Light, and I've Been Looking For You got released on the 2022 album So Happy It Hurts.

Bryan Adams explained the songwriting process for the musical in the Dutch newspaper Metro. "Writing that musical was a masterclass in songwriting, it was also a masterclass in not losing your mind, as there was so much re-writing and rejection during the process of the production. But that doesn't mean that the rejected songs haven't found a home. I love I've Been Looking For You, Please Stay, and I Could Get Used To This, and of course it's too bad they aren't in the musical, but that's the way the Broadway ball bounces."

Release and promotion
To date, Pretty Woman – The Musical is the only Bryan Adams not be released physically. It was only released on YouTube, Spotify, and several other streaming services.

Track listing

Personnel

Musicians
All vocals and instruments performed by Bryan Adams
except:
Jim Vallance –  Wurlitzer electric piano (1, 16), percussion (15), percussion programming (1, 11), chorus arpeggios (12), piano (3, 11, 15), synth bass (11), keyboards (5, 10, 15) 
David Foster – Synth strings (6)
Ramon Stagnaro – Spanish guitar (6)
Keith Scott – Guitar (7)

Production 
 Produced by Bryan Adams
 Recorded and mixed by Hayden Watson 
 Recorded at The Warehouse Studio (Vancouver, Canada).
 Mastered by Bob Ludwig at Gateway Mastering (Portland, Maine, USA).
 Cover photography by Bryan Adams

References

2022 albums
BMG Rights Management albums
Bryan Adams albums